Gilgamesh, published in 2001, is the first full-length novel written by Joan London. It is inspired by the Epic of Gilgamesh, the world's oldest known poem.

In 2002, the novel was shortlisted for the Miles Franklin Literary Award and was selected as The Age Book of the Year for Fiction. The book has been published with some success in Australia, the United Kingdom, and the United States of America. It has also been published in Europe.

Awards and honors
Western Australian Premier's Book Awards, Fiction, 2001: shortlisted
New South Wales Premier's Literary Awards, Christina Stead Prize for Fiction, 2002: shortlisted
The Age Book of the Year Award, Fiction Prize, 2002: winner
Miles Franklin Literary Award, 2002: shortlisted
Gilgamesh was listed in The New York Times Book Review section as one of the Notable Books of 2003.

References

External links
Guardian review
Middlemiss Website: Gilgmesh

2001 Australian novels
Novels set in Western Australia
Works based on the Epic of Gilgamesh
2001 debut novels
Novels based on poems
Pan Books books